Richard Fletcher may refer to:

Politicians
 Richard Fletcher (American politician) (1788–1869), US Representative from Massachusetts
Richard Fletcher (died 1560), MP for Rye
Richard Fletcher (died c.1607), MP for Derby (UK Parliament constituency)

Others
 Richard Fletcher (bishop) (1545–1596), Anglican bishop
 Sir Richard Fletcher, 1st Baronet (1768–1813), British army officer
 Richard A. Fletcher (1944–2005), British historian
 Richard Fletcher (rugby league) (born 1981), British rugby league player
 Dick Fletcher (1942–2008), meteorologist
 Richard Fletcher (conductor), American conductor of symphony, opera and ballet orchestras

See also 
 Richard Fletcher-Vane, 2nd Baron Inglewood (born 1951), British Conservative Party politician